Rouvroy-Ripont is a commune in the Marne department in north-eastern France.

It had only two inhabitants in 1999, but grew to eight inhabitants in 2017.

Population

See also
Communes of the Marne department

References

Rouvroyripont